Politics of Washington may refer to:

 Politics of Washington (state)
 Politics of Washington, D.C.
 Politics of the United States at the federal level
 The politics of George Washington, the president of the United States from 1789 to 1797